The Blanche River (in French: rivière Blanche) is a tributary of the Bulstrode River whose current flows successively into the Nicolet River and St. Lawrence River. The Blanche river flows in the town of Victoriaville and in the municipality of Saint-Valère, in the Arthabaska Regional County Municipality (MRC), in the administrative region of Centre-du-Québec, in province of Quebec, in Canada.

Geography 

The neighboring geographic slopes of the Blanche River are:
 north side: Bulstrode River;
 east side: Bulstrode River, Blanchette stream;
 south side: Nicolet River;
 west side: Bergeron stream, Martin stream.

The Blanche river takes its source from various agricultural streams, in an agricultural zone of the Courtois range, located north of the hamlet "Place-Béréli", north-east of Saint-Albert, southwest of the town of Victoriaville and north of the Nicolet River.

  southwesterly, to the second crossing of route 122;
  towards the north-west, to its mouth.

The Blanche river flows on the south bank of the Bulstrode River, in front of the village of Saint-Valère and downstream of Victoriaville.

Toponymy 

The toponym "rivière Blanche" was made official on July 4, 1980, at the Commission de toponymie du Québec.

See also 

 Arthabaska Regional County Municipality (MRC)
 Victoriaville, a city
 Saint-Valère, a municipality
 Bulstrode River, a stream
 Nicolet River, a stream
 List of rivers of Quebec

References 

Arthabaska Regional County Municipality
Rivers of Centre-du-Québec